Nepal competed at the 2000 Summer Olympics in Sydney, Australia.

Results by event

Athletics
Men's 5000 m
Gyan Bahadur Bohara
 Round 1 – 14:34.15 (did not advance) 34th place

Women's 100 m
Devi Maya Paneru
 Round 1 – 12.74 (did not advance)

Shooting
Bhagawati Khatri

Swimming
Men's 50 m freestyle
Chitra Bahadur Gurung
 Preliminary Heat – 27.02 (did not advance)

Women's 50 m freestyle
Runa Pradhan
 Preliminary Heat – 31.28 (did not advance)

References
Wallechinsky, David (2004). The Complete Book of the Summer Olympics (Athens 2004 Edition). Toronto, Canada. . 
International Olympic Committee (2001). The Results. Retrieved 12 November 2005.
Sydney Organising Committee for the Olympic Games (2001). Official Report of the XXVII Olympiad Volume 1: Preparing for the Games. Retrieved 20 November 2005.
Sydney Organising Committee for the Olympic Games (2001). Official Report of the XXVII Olympiad Volume 2: Celebrating the Games. Retrieved 20 November 2005.
Sydney Organising Committee for the Olympic Games (2001). The Results. Retrieved 20 November 2005.
International Olympic Committee Web Site

Nations at the 2000 Summer Olympics
2000
2000 in Nepalese sport